Su Qing (1914–1982) was a twentieth-century Chinese writer. Known for her work detailing the female experience, she was a contemporary of Eileen Chang and is often compared to her.

Life
Su Qing was born in 1914 in Ningbo, Zhejiang Province. In 1933, at the age of nineteen, she was admitted to National Central University (now Nanjing University) as an English major.

Due to family pressure, she quit school and married a man that her parents selected. She moved to Shanghai with her husband. In the 1940s, after an unhappy ten-year marriage, she and her husband divorced. She then started her new life as an occupational writer.

Su Qing was appointed as an editor at Shaoxing Opera Group after the Anti-Japanese War. During the War of Liberation, she publicly criticized the Communist government in a series of essays and was eventually jailed for two years in 1955. Due to the bold subject matter of her work and her alleged connections to hanjian (those who were viewed as race traitors), Su Qing's career was troubled near the end of her life, and she was widely attacked and insulted by anti-hanjian groups. She died in Shanghai in 1982 after struggling with poverty and illness.

Works
Su Qing was once called Feng Yunzhuang and used the pen name Feng Heyi for her early works. She began her writing career in 1935 and started using Su Qing as her pen name in 1937. Much of her work serves on commentary on the patriarchal society she lived in and the role of women in it.

Delivery, her first work, was published in the magazine called Lun Yu. Most of her works were published in magazines including: The Wind of the Universe, Yi Jing, Ancient and Modern, The Talk about the Weather, and Heaven and Earth.

Most of the essays she wrote between 1935 and 1944 were collected into one of her major works, Drifting Brocade. This work alluded to her personal life, and Su Qing said that "these essays are a reminiscence of my past."

Her representative work, Ten Years of Marriage was published in 1943. The semi-autobiographical novel describes her experiences about her married life. It contains her initial feelings on marriage, the bitterness and happiness of delivery, the extramarital love and the associations with different kinds of men. Owing to the authentic descriptions of sexual psychology, she was described as a bold female writer and received both praise and blame. The fiction had its separate edition the following year. Ten Years of Marriage had 18 editions at the end of 1948, which surpassed Eileen Chang's fiction. In 1947, she created the continuation of Ten Years of Marriage.

She also wrote a novel called The Beauty on the Wrong Road, which caused a shortage of printing paper.

During the years at Shaoxing Opera Group, she compiled these plays: Hate Remains in the Land, Qu Yuan, Baoyu and Daiyu and The Biography of Li Wa. Baoyu and Daiyu has been performed more than 300 times since 1954 and created the highest records of the Opera group.

See also 
 Lü Bicheng – a Republican-era activist and writer

References

External links
 Women writers in 1940s Shanghai who were not Eileen Chang (article)
 Su Qing on renditions.org

Chinese women novelists
1914 births
1982 deaths
20th-century women writers
20th-century Chinese novelists
20th-century Chinese short story writers
Chinese women short story writers
Chinese dramatists and playwrights
People's Republic of China writers
Republic of China short story writers
Republic of China novelists
Short story writers from Shanghai
Victims of the Cultural Revolution